Hyde or Hydes may refer to:

People 
Hyde (surname) 
Hyde (musician), Japanese musician from the bands L'Arc-en-Ciel and VAMPS

American statutes 
Hyde Amendment, an amendment that places well-defined limitations on Medicare spending on abortion
Hyde Amendment (1997), a federal statute that allows federal courts to award attorneys' fees and court costs to criminal defendants in some situations

Fictional characters 
Mr. Edward Hyde, character in Strange Case of Dr Jekyll and Mr Hyde, 1886 novella by Robert Louis Stevenson
Mister Hyde (comics), Marvel Comics supervillain
Steven Hyde, a character in the U.S. TV series That 70s Show
Hyde, character in Tensou Sentai Goseiger
Hyde, character in Beyblade Burst Turbo

Places

England
Hyde, Greater Manchester, a town in Tameside, North West England
Hyde, Bedfordshire, a parish near Luton (including East Hyde, West Hyde, and The Hyde)
Hyde, a shrunken village in Gloucestershire, in the township of Pinnock and Hyde
Hyde, Hampshire, a village in the New Forest
Hyde, Winchester, a suburb of Winchester, Hampshire, containing the remains of Hyde Abbey
West Hyde, Hertfordshire
Hyde Heath, Buckinghamshire, a hamlet near Chesham
The Hyde, London, an area in the London Borough of Barnet

United States
Hydes, Maryland
Hyde, Pennsylvania
Hyde, Wisconsin
Hyde County, North Carolina
Hyde County, South Dakota
Hydes Lake, a lake in Minnesota

Elsewhere
Hyde (Cappadocia), town of ancient Cappadocia, now in Turkey
Hyde, New Zealand
Hyde Glacier, Antarctica

Other uses
 History Database of the Global Environment, shortened as HYDE
 Hyde School (Bath), in Bath, Maine and Woodstock, CT USA
 M2 Hyde, submachine-gun produced for the US Army from 1942 to 1943
 Hyde Act, United States–India Peaceful Atomic Energy Cooperation Act of 2006
 Hyde F.C., English Conference football team
 Hyde Middle School, a middle school in Cupertino, CA USA
 Holt Hyde, a character in the Monster High franchise
 Hyde (EP), an EP by VIXX
 Hyde Chronicle, mediaeval chronicle

See also 
 Dr. Jekyll and Mr. Hyde (disambiguation)
 Hide (disambiguation)
 Hyd (disambiguation)
 Hyde Park (disambiguation)
 Hyde Hall (disambiguation)